Scott Charles Maddox (born March 13, 1968) is an American politician. He was the mayor of Tallahassee, Florida, from 1995 to 1996 and from 1997 to 2005. Maddox is the former chair of the Florida Democratic Party and a former Tallahassee City Commissioner, serving from 1993 to 1995, 1996 to 1997 and from 2012 to 2018.

Maddox was indicted on December 12, 2018, on 44 charges, including racketeering, bribery, extortion, bank fraud and wire fraud, in an FBI investigation into corruption that played a key role in Democrat Andrew Gillum’s campaign for Florida governor. Maddox was suspended from the Tallahassee City Commission following the indictment and subsequently replaced after the appointment  of Commissioner Elaine W. Bryant, Ph.D. on December 31, 2018. In September 2021, Maddox was sentenced to five years in prison.

Early life and education
Scott Maddox was born in Hialeah, Florida, and raised in the rural area of Homestead, Florida, and later, in Tallahassee, Florida. He graduated from Leon High School and attended Florida State University, where he earned a B.S. in political science and public administration. He went on to earn a J.D. from Florida State University College of Law. Maddox was a member of the Kappa Alpha Order men's fraternity.

Political career
In 1990, at the age of 22, Maddox ran for the Florida House of Representative's 10th district, but lost the Democratic primary by 32%. In 1993, while still in law school, Maddox became the youngest city commissioner in the city of Tallahassee's history, being elected at the age of 24, and a year later selected to become mayor pro-tempore. In 1995, the city commission chose Maddox as the city's mayor, where he worked towards improving race relations and overseeing a large expansion of city parks, greenways, and trails. After the residents of Tallahassee passed a referendum calling for popular elections for the office of mayor, Maddox became Tallahassee's first popularly elected city mayor in 1996. In 1999, he served as president of the Florida League of Cities. Described as a "rising star" by Vice President Al Gore, Maddox spoke at the 2000 Democratic National Convention. Maddox attempted a run for Attorney General of Florida in 2002, but lost to future Orlando mayor Buddy Dyer in the Democratic primary. In 2003, Maddox was elected chairman of the Florida Democratic Party and also served as a member of the Democratic National Committee. Though Maddox announced a run for Governor of Florida in 2006, he ultimately dropped out of the race. In 2010, he served as the Democratic nominee for Florida's Commissioner of Agriculture and Consumer Services, losing to Republican nominee Adam Putnam. Maddox was elected to the Tallahassee City Commission once again in 2012. In 2015, he announced a run for Superintendent of Leon County Schools. After failing to gain traction in the Democratic primary, Maddox dropped out during qualifying week. He was subsequently re-elected to the city commission in August 2016.

Family
He lives in Tallahassee.

Electoral history

References

External links
Scott Maddox  - Official campaign website.
Archived Mayoral Page (March 2, 2001)

Florida State University alumni
Florida State University College of Law alumni
Florida Democrats
State political party chairs of Florida
Living people
1968 births
People from Homestead, Florida
Mayors of Tallahassee, Florida
Florida politicians convicted of crimes
Prisoners and detainees of the United States federal government